Leinster Cricket Club was founded in Rathgar in 1852. The Dublin sports club now hosts tennis, squash, table tennis, bowls and cricket. The Leinster Sports Club complex is situated in the Observatory Lane ground, in the heart of Rathmines. The cricket section currently has eight men's teams, three women's sides and fifteen youth sides.

In 1860, Leinster hosted the first visit to Ireland by the All-England XI on the club's field in Lord Palmerston's demesne. The club also brought W. G. Grace to Ireland for the first time in 1873. In 1875 Ireland's rugby union team played its first home game at the cricket ground as Lansdowne Road was deemed unsuitable.

Leinster hold the record for the most Leinster Senior League titles, with 23.

Honours
 Irish Senior Cup: 1
 2009
 Leinster Senior League: 24
 1919, 1920, 1928, 1929, 1930, 1931, 1932, 1933, 1934, 1935, 1937, 1939, 1941, 1944, 1950, 1953, 1959, 1963, 1981, 1982, 1984, 1998, 2012, 2017
 Leinster Senior Cup: 10
 1936, 1941, 1953, 1955, 1956, 1958, 1968, 1981, 1985, 1998

Selected current players
George Dockrell
Gareth Delany

Selected former players
David Bevan
Louis Bookman
Carlos Brathwaite
Gerry Duffy
Eddie Ingram
Trent Johnston
Bob Lambert
Jack Short

References

External links
Official Leinster Sports Club website
LCC Cricket Section website
LCC Tennis Section website

Cricket clubs established in 1852
Leinster Senior League (cricket) teams
Cricket clubs in County Dublin
1852 establishments in Ireland
Sports clubs in Dublin (city)